Bruce D. Boehler (July 8, 1917 – July 2, 1987) was an American professional basketball player. He played for the Cleveland Allmen Transfers in the National Basketball League for five games during the 1945–46 season and averaged 1.6 points per game.

He participated in basketball, baseball, and track at the University of Kentucky. Boehler served in World War II and became a schoolteacher.

References

1917 births
1987 deaths
United States Army personnel of World War II
American men's basketball players
Basketball players from Ohio
Cleveland Allmen Transfers players
Guards (basketball)
Kentucky Wildcats baseball players
Kentucky Wildcats men's basketball players
Kentucky Wildcats men's track and field athletes
People from Lorain, Ohio
People from Tiffin, Ohio